Gallego is a Spanish surname. It is a regional name denoting someone from Galicia. Notable people with the surname include:

Américo Gallego, Argentine footballer
Antonio Gallego Gallego, Spanish musicologist
Blas Gallego (born 1941), Spanish artist
Fernando Gallego (born c. 1440), Spanish painter
Gerald and Charlene Gallego, a married couple who committed serial murders from 1978 to 1980
Gina Gallego (born 1955), American actor
José Gallego (footballer born 1923), Spanish footballer who played in England in the 1950s
José Gallego (footballer born 1959), Spanish footballer with Athletic Bilbao
Joseph Shalom Gallego ( 1624), poet and cantor
Luis Miguel Gallego (born 1970), Mexican singer 
Mike Gallego (born 1960), American baseball player and coach
Pete Gallego, Texas politician
Ricardo Gallego, Spanish footballer
Ruben Gallego (born 1979), American politician
Rubén Gallego (born 1968), Russian writer
Soledad Gallego-Díaz (born 1950/1951), Spanish journalist

See also
Gallego (disambiguation)
Gallegos, surname
Gallegos (disambiguation)
Galicia (Spain), place of origin for Gallego, Gallegos and los Gallegos names for "those from Galicia"

Spanish-language surnames
Spanish toponymic surnames
Ethnonymic surnames